The men's 400 metres hurdles event at the 1973 Summer Universiade was held at the Central Lenin Stadium in Moscow on 18, 19 and 20 August.

Medalists

Results

Heats

Semifinals

Final

References

Athletics at the 1973 Summer Universiade
1973